

Events

Pre-1600
70 – Titus ends the siege of Jerusalem after destroying Herod's Temple.
1282 – Peter III of Aragon lands at Trapani to intervene in the War of the Sicilian Vespers.
1363 – The five-week Battle of Lake Poyang begins, in which the forces of two Chinese rebel leaders (Chen Youliang and Zhu Yuanzhang) meet to decide who will supplant the Yuan dynasty.
1464 – Pope Paul II succeeds Pope Pius II as the 211th pope.
1574 – Guru Ram Das becomes the Fourth Sikh Guru/Master.
1590 – Tokugawa Ieyasu enters Edo Castle. (Traditional Japanese date: August 1, 1590)
1594 – King James VI of Scotland holds a masque at the baptism of Prince Henry at Stirling Castle.

1601–1900
1721 – The Great Northern War between Sweden and Russia ends in the Treaty of Nystad.
1727 – Anne, eldest daughter of King George II of Great Britain, is given the title Princess Royal.
1757 – Battle of Gross-Jägersdorf: Russian force under Field Marshal Stepan Fyodorovich Apraksin beats a smaller Prussian force commanded by Field Marshal Hans von Lehwaldt, during the Seven Years' War.
1791 –  sinks after having run aground on the outer Great Barrier Reef the previous day.
1799 – The entire Dutch fleet is captured by British forces under the command of Sir Ralph Abercromby and Admiral Sir Charles Mitchell during the War of the Second Coalition.
1800 – Gabriel Prosser postpones a planned slave rebellion in Richmond, Virginia, but is arrested before he can make it happen.
1813 – First Battle of Kulm: French forces are defeated by an Austrian-Prussian-Russian alliance.
  1813   – Creek War: Fort Mims massacre: Creek "Red Sticks" kill over 500 settlers (including over 250 armed militia) in Fort Mims, north of Mobile, Alabama.
1835 – Australia: Melbourne, Victoria is founded.
1836 – The city of Houston is founded by Augustus Chapman Allen and John Kirby Allen.
1862 – American Civil War: Battle of Richmond: Confederates under Edmund Kirby Smith rout Union forces under General William "Bull" Nelson.
1873 – Austrian explorers Julius von Payer and Karl Weyprecht discover the archipelago of Franz Josef Land in the Arctic Sea.
1896 – Philippine Revolution: After Spanish victory in the Battle of San Juan del Monte, eight provinces in the Philippines are declared under martial law by the Spanish Governor-General Ramón Blanco y Erenas.

1901–present
1909 – Burgess Shale fossils are discovered by Charles Doolittle Walcott.
1914 – World War I: Germans defeat the Russians in the Battle of Tannenberg.
1916 – Ernest Shackleton completes the rescue of all of his men stranded on Elephant Island in Antarctica.
1917 – Vietnamese prison guards led by Trịnh Văn Cấn mutiny at the Thái Nguyên penitentiary against local French authority.
1918 – Fanni Kaplan shoots and seriously injures Bolshevik leader Vladimir Lenin, which along with the assassination of Bolshevik senior official Moisei Uritsky days earlier, prompts the decree for Red Terror.
1922 – Battle of Dumlupınar: The final battle in the Greco-Turkish War ("Turkish War of Independence").
1936 – The RMS Queen Mary wins the Blue Riband by setting the fastest transatlantic crossing.
1940 – The Second Vienna Award reassigns the territory of Northern Transylvania from Romania to Hungary.
1941 – The Tighina Agreement, a treaty regarding administration issues of the Transnistria Governorate, is signed between Germany and Romania.
1942 – World War II: The Battle of Alam el Halfa begins.
1945 – The Japanese occupation of Hong Kong comes to an end.
  1945   – The Supreme Commander of the Allied Forces, General Douglas MacArthur lands at Atsugi Air Force Base.
  1945   – The Allied Control Council, governing Germany after World War II, comes into being.
1959 – South Vietnamese opposition figure Phan Quang Dan was elected to the National Assembly despite soldiers being bussed in to vote for President Ngo Dinh Diem's candidate.
1962 – Japan conducts a test of the NAMC YS-11, its first aircraft since World War II and its only successful commercial aircraft from before or after the war.
1963 – The Moscow–Washington hotline between the leaders of the U.S. and the Soviet Union goes into operation.
1967 – Thurgood Marshall is confirmed as the first African American Justice of the Supreme Court of the United States.
1974 – A Belgrade–Dortmund express train derails at the main train station in Zagreb killing 153 passengers.
  1974   – A powerful bomb explodes at the Mitsubishi Heavy Industries headquarters in Marunouchi, Tokyo. Eight are killed, 378 are injured. Eight left-wing activists are arrested on May 19, 1975, by Japanese authorities.
  1974   – The Third World Population Conference ends in Bucharest, Romania. At the end of the ceremony, the UN-Romanian Demographic Centre is inaugurated.
1981 – President Mohammad-Ali Rajai and Prime Minister Mohammad-Javad Bahonar of Iran are assassinated in a bombing committed by the People's Mujahedin of Iran.
1983 – Aeroflot Flight 5463 crashes into Dolan Mountain while approaching Almaty International Airport in present-day Kazakhstan, killing all 90 people on board.
1984 – STS-41-D: The Space Shuttle Discovery takes off on its maiden voyage.
1991 – Dissolution of the Soviet Union: Azerbaijan declares independence from Soviet Union.
1992 – The 11-day Ruby Ridge standoff ends with Randy Weaver surrendering to federal authorities.
1995 – Bosnian War: NATO launches Operation Deliberate Force against Bosnian Serb forces.
1998 – Second Congo War: Armed forces of the Democratic Republic of the Congo (DRC) and their Angolan and Zimbabwean allies recapture Matadi and the Inga dams in the western DRC from RCD and Rwandan troops. 
2002 – Rico Linhas Aéreas Flight 4823 crashes on approach to Rio Branco International Airport, killing 23 of the 31 people on board.
2008 – A Conviasa Boeing 737 crashes into Illiniza Volcano in Ecuador, killing all three people on board.
2014 – Prime Minister of Lesotho Tom Thabane flees to South Africa as the army allegedly stages a coup.
2019 – A huge accident during the 2019 F2 Spa Feature Race caused young driver Anthoine Hubert to die after sustaining major injuries.
2021 – The last remaining American troops leave Afghanistan, ending U.S. involvement in the war.

Births

Pre-1600
1334 – Peter of Castile (d. 1369)
1574 – Albert Szenczi Molnár, Hungarian writer and translator (d. 1634)

1601–1900
1609 – Sir Alexander Carew, 2nd Baronet, English politician (d. 1644)
  1609   – Artus Quellinus the Elder, Flemish sculptor (d. 1668)
1627 – Itō Jinsai, Japanese philosopher (d. 1705)
1716 – Capability Brown, English landscape architect (d. 1783)
1720 – Samuel Whitbread, English brewer and politician, founded Whitbread (d. 1796)
1748 – Jacques-Louis David, French painter and illustrator (d. 1825)
1768 – Joseph Dennie, American author and journalist (d. 1812)
1797 – Mary Shelley, English novelist and playwright (d. 1851) 
1812 – Agoston Haraszthy, Hungarian-American businessman, founded Buena Vista Winery (d. 1869)
1818 – Alexander H. Rice, American businessman and politician, 30th Governor of Massachusetts (d. 1895)
1839 – Gulstan Ropert, French-American bishop and missionary (d. 1903)
1842 – Grand Duchess Alexandra Alexandrovna of Russia (d. 1849)
1844 – Emily Ruete/Salama bint Said, also called Sayyida Salme, a Princess of Zanzibar and Oman (d. 1924)
1848 – Andrew Onderdonk, American surveyor and contractor (d. 1905)
1850 – Marcelo H. del Pilar, Filipino journalist and lawyer (d. 1896)
1852 – Jacobus Henricus van 't Hoff, Dutch chemist and academic, Nobel Prize laureate (d. 1911)
  1852   – J. Alden Weir, American painter and academic (d. 1919)
1855 – Evelyn De Morgan, English painter (d. 1919)
1856 – Carl David Tolmé Runge, German mathematician, physicist, and spectroscopist (d. 1927)
1858 – Ignaz Sowinski, Galician architect (d. 1917)
1860 – Isaac Levitan, Russian painter and illustrator (d. 1900)
1870 – Grand Duchess Alexandra Georgievna of Russia (d. 1891)
1871 – Ernest Rutherford, New Zealand-English physicist and chemist, Nobel Prize laureate (d. 1937)
1883 – Theo van Doesburg, Dutch artist (d. 1931)
1884 – Theodor Svedberg, Swedish chemist and physicist, Nobel Prize laureate (d. 1971)
1885 – Tedda Courtney, Australian rugby league player and coach (d. 1957)
1887 – Paul Kochanski, Polish violinist and composer (d. 1934)
1890 – Samuel Frederick Henry Thompson, English captain and pilot (d. 1918)
1893 – Huey Long, American lawyer and politician, 40th Governor of Louisiana (d. 1935)
1896 – Raymond Massey, Canadian-American actor and playwright (d. 1983)
1898 – Shirley Booth, American actress and singer (d. 1992)

1901–present
1901 – John Gunther, American journalist and author (d. 1970)
  1901   – Roy Wilkins, American journalist and activist (d. 1981)
1903 – Bhagwati Charan Verma, Indian author (d. 1981)
1906 – Joan Blondell, American actress and singer (d. 1979)
  1906   – Olga Taussky-Todd, Austrian mathematician (d. 1995)
1907 – Leonor Fini, Argentinian painter, illustrator, and author (d. 1996)
  1907   – Bertha Parker Pallan, American archaeologist (d. 1978)
  1907   – John Mauchly, American physicist and co-founder of the first computer company (d. 1980)
1908 – Fred MacMurray, American actor (d. 1991)
1909 – Virginia Lee Burton, American author and illustrator (d. 1968)
1910 – Roger Bushell, South African-English soldier and pilot (d. 1944)
1912 – Edward Mills Purcell, American physicist, Nobel Prize laureate (d. 1997)
  1912   – Nancy Wake, New Zealand-English captain (d. 2011)
1913 – Richard Stone, English economist and statistician, Nobel Prize laureate (d. 1991)
1915 – Princess Lilian, Duchess of Halland (d. 2013)
  1915   – Robert Strassburg, American composer, conductor, and educator (d. 2003)
1916 – Shailendra, Pakistani-Indian songwriter (d. 1968)
1917 – Denis Healey, English soldier and politician, Chancellor of the Exchequer (d. 2015)
  1917   – Grand Duke Vladimir Kirillovich of Russia (d. 1992)
1918 – Harold Atcherley, English businessman (d. 2017)
  1918   – Billy Johnson, American baseball player (d. 2006)
  1918   – Ted Williams, American baseball player and manager (d. 2002)
1919 – Maurice Hilleman, American microbiologist and vaccinologist (d. 2005)
  1919   – Wolfgang Wagner, German director and manager (d. 2010)
  1919   – Kitty Wells, American singer-songwriter and guitarist (d. 2012)
1920 – Arnold Green, Estonian soldier and politician (d. 2011)
1922 – Lionel Murphy, Australian jurist and politician, 22nd Attorney-General of Australia (d. 1986)
  1922   – Regina Resnik, American soprano and actress (d. 2013)
1923 – Barbara Ansell, English physician and author (d. 2001)
  1923   – Charmian Clift, Australian journalist and author (d. 1969)
  1923   – Vic Seixas, American tennis player
1924 – Kenny Dorham, American singer-songwriter and trumpet player (d. 1972)
  1924   – Lajos Kisfaludy, Hungarian chemist and engineer (d. 1988)
1925 – Laurent de Brunhoff, French author and illustrator
  1925   – Donald Symington, American actor (d. 2013)
1926 – Daryl Gates, American police officer, created the D.A.R.E. Program (d. 2010)
1927 – Geoffrey Beene, American fashion designer (d. 2004)
  1927   – Bill Daily, American actor and comedian (d. 2018)
  1927   – Piet Kee, Dutch organist and composer (d.2018)
1928 – Lloyd Casner, American race car driver (d. 1965)
  1928   – Harvey Hart, Canadian director and producer (d. 1989)
  1928   – Johnny Mann, American singer-songwriter and conductor (d. 2014)
1929 – Guy de Lussigny, French painter and sculptor (d. 2001)
  1929   – Ian McNaught-Davis, English mountaineer and television host (d. 2014)
1930 – Warren Buffett, American businessman and philanthropist
  1930   – Noel Harford, New Zealand cricketer and basketball player (d. 1981)
1931 – Jack Swigert, American pilot and astronaut (d. 1982)
1933 – Don Getty, Canadian football player and politician, 11th Premier of Alberta (d. 2016)
1934 – Antonio Cabangon Chua, Filipino media mogul and businessman (d. 2016)
1935 – John Phillips, American singer-songwriter and guitarist (d. 2001)
  1935   – Alexandra Bellow, Romanian-American mathematician
1936 – Peter North, English scholar and academic
1937 – Bruce McLaren, New Zealand race car driver and engineer, founded the McLaren racing team (d. 1970)
1938 – Murray Gleeson, Australian lawyer and judge, 11th Chief Justice of Australia
1939 – Elizabeth Ashley, American actress 
  1939   – John Peel, English radio host and producer (d. 2004)
1941 – Ignazio Giunti, Italian race car driver (d. 1971)
  1941   – Ben Jones, American actor and politician
  1941   – Sue MacGregor, English journalist and radio host
  1941   – John McNally, English singer and guitarist
1942 – Jonathan Aitken, Irish-British journalist and politician, Minister for Defence Procurement
  1942   – Pervez Sajjad, Pakistani cricketer
1943 – Tal Brody, American-Israeli basketball player and coach
  1943   – Robert Crumb, American illustrator
  1943   – Colin Dann, English author
  1943   – Nigel Hall, English sculptor and academic
  1943   – Jean-Claude Killy, French skier
  1943   – David Maslanka, American composer and academic (d. 2017)
1944 – Frances Cairncross, English economist, journalist, and academic
  1944   – Freek de Jonge, Dutch singer and comedian 
  1944   – Molly Ivins, American journalist and author (d. 2007)
  1944   – Tug McGraw, American baseball player (d. 2004)
  1944   – Alex Wyllie, New Zealand rugby player and coach
1946 – Queen Anne-Marie of Greece
  1946   – Peggy Lipton, American model and actress (d. 2019)
1947 – Allan Rock, Canadian lawyer, politician, and diplomat, Canadian Ambassador to the United Nations
1948 – Lewis Black, American comedian, actor, and author
  1948   – Fred Hampton, American activist and revolutionary, chairman of the Illinois chapter of the Black Panther Party (d. 1969)
  1948   – Victor Skumin, Russian psychiatrist, psychologist, and academic
1949 – Ted Ammon, American financier and banker (d. 2001)
  1949   – Don Boudria, Canadian public servant and politician, 2nd Canadian Minister for International Cooperation
1950 – Antony Gormley, English sculptor and academic
1951 – Jim Paredes, Filipino singer-songwriter and actor 
  1951   – Timothy Bottoms, American actor and producer
  1951   – Dana Rosemary Scallon, Irish singer and activist
  1951   – Gediminas Kirkilas, Lithuanian politician, 11th Prime Minister of Lithuania
1952 – Simon Bainbridge, English composer and educator (d. 2021)
  1952   – Wojtek Fibak, Polish tennis player
1953 – Ron George, American businessman and politician
  1953   – Lech Majewski, Polish director, producer, and screenwriter
  1953   – Horace Panter, English bass player 
  1953   – Robert Parish, American basketball player
1954 – Alexander Lukashenko, Belarusian marshal and politician, 1st President of Belarus
  1954   – Ravi Shankar Prasad, Indian lawyer and politician, Indian Minister of Communications and IT
  1954   – David Paymer, American actor and director
1955 – Jamie Moses, English-American guitarist
1956 – Frank Conniff, American actor, producer, and screenwriter
1958 – Karen Buck, Northern Irish politician
  1958   – Fran Fraschilla, American basketball player, coach, and sportscaster
  1958   – Muriel Gray, Scottish journalist and author
  1958   – Martin Jackson, English drummer 
  1958   – Anna Politkovskaya, Russian journalist and activist (d. 2006)
  1958   – Peter Tunks, Australian rugby league player and sportscaster
1959 – Mark "Jacko" Jackson, Australian footballer, actor, and singer
1960 – Ben Bradshaw, English journalist and politician, Secretary of State for Culture, Media and Sport
  1960   – Gary Gordon, American sergeant, Medal of Honor recipient (d. 1993)
  1960   – Guy A. Lepage, Canadian comedian and producer
1962 – Ricky Sanders, American football player
  1962   – Craig Whittaker, English businessman and politician
1963 – Dave Brockie, Canadian-American singer-songwriter and bass player (d. 2014)
  1963   – Michael Chiklis, American actor, director, and producer
  1963   – Sabine Oberhauser, Austrian physician and politician (d. 2017)
  1963   – Phil Mills, Welsh race car driver
1964 – Gavin Fisher, English engineer and designer
  1964   – Ra Luhse, Estonian architect
1966 – Peter Cunnah, Northern Irish singer-songwriter and producer
  1966   – Joann Fletcher, English historian and academic
1967 – Frederique van der Wal, Dutch model and actress
  1967   – Justin Vaughan, New Zealand cricketer
1968 – Diran Adebayo, English author and critic
  1968   – Vladimir Malakhov, Russian ice hockey player
1969 – Vladimir Jugović, Serbian footballer
  1969   – Dimitris Sgouros, Greek pianist and composer
1970 – Carlo Checchinato, Italian rugby player and manager
  1970   – Paulo Sousa, Portuguese footballer and manager
  1970   – Michael Wong, Malaysian-Chinese singer-songwriter 
1971 – Lars Frederiksen, American singer-songwriter and guitarist 
  1971   – Julian Smith, Scottish politician
1972 – Cameron Diaz, American model, actress, and producer
  1972   – Pavel Nedvěd, Czech footballer
1973 – Lisa Ling, American journalist and author
1974 – Javier Otxoa, Spanish cyclist (d. 2018)
1975 – Radhi Jaïdi, Tunisian footballer and coach
1976 – Mike Koplove, American baseball player
1977 – Shaun Alexander, American football player
  1977   – Marlon Byrd, American baseball player
  1977   – Kamil Kosowski, Polish footballer
  1977   – Félix Sánchez, American-Dominican runner and hurdler
1978 – Sinead Kerr, Scottish figure skater
  1978   – Cliff Lee, American baseball player
1979 – Juan Ignacio Chela, Argentinian tennis player
  1979   – Leon Lopez, English singer-songwriter and actor
  1979   – Scott Richmond, Canadian baseball player
1980 – Justin Mortelliti, American actor and singer-songwriter
1981 – Germán Legarreta, Puerto Rican-American actor
  1981   – Adam Wainwright, American baseball player
1982 – Will Davison, Australian race car driver
  1982   – Andy Roddick, American tennis player
1983 – Emmanuel Culio, Argentinian footballer
  1983   – Gustavo Eberto, Argentinian footballer (d. 2007)
  1983   – Jun Matsumoto, Japanese singer, dancer, and actor 
  1983   – Simone Pepe, Italian footballer
  1983   – Tian Qin, Chinese canoe racer
  1983   – Marco Vianello, Italian footballer
1984 – Anthony Ireland, Zimbabwean cricketer
1985 – Richard Duffy, Welsh footballer
  1985   – Joe Inoue, American singer-songwriter
  1985   – Leisel Jones, Australian swimmer
  1985   – Éva Risztov, Hungarian swimmer
  1985   – Steven Smith, Scottish footballer
  1985   – Eamon Sullivan, Australian swimmer
  1985   – Anna Ushenina, Ukrainian chess player
  1985   – Holly Weston, English actress
1986 – Theo Hutchcraft, English singer-songwriter 
  1986   – Lelia Masaga, New Zealand rugby player
  1986   – Ryan Ross, American singer-songwriter and guitarist 
  1986   – Zafer Yelen, Turkish footballer
1987 – Tania Foster, English singer-songwriter 
1988 – Ernests Gulbis, Latvian tennis player
1989 – Simone Guerra, Italian footballer
  1989   – Ronald Huth, Paraguayan footballer
  1989   – Bebe Rexha, American singer-songwriter 
1991 – Seriki Audu, Nigerian footballer (d. 2014)
  1991   – Jacqueline Cako, American tennis player
  1991   – Liam Cooper, Scottish footballer
1992 – Jessica Henwick, British actress
1994 – Monika Povilaitytė, Lithuanian volleyball player
1994   – Heo Young-ji, South Korean singer
  1994   – Kwon So-hyun, South Korean singer-songwriter and actress

Deaths

Pre-1600
 526 – Theodoric the Great, Italian ruler (b. 454)
 832 – Cui Qun, Chinese chancellor (b. 772)
1131 – Hervey le Breton, bishop of Bangor and Ely 
1181 – Pope Alexander III (b. c. 1100–1105)
1329 – Khutughtu Khan Kusala, Chinese emperor (b. 1300)
1428 – Emperor Shōkō of Japan (b. 1401)
1483 – Louis XI of France (b. 1423)
1500 – Victor, Duke of Münsterberg and Opava, Count of Glatz (b. 1443)
1580 – Emmanuel Philibert, Duke of Savoy (b. 1528)

1601–1900
1604 – John Juvenal Ancina, Italian Oratorian and bishop (b. 1545)
1619 – Shimazu Yoshihiro, Japanese samurai and warlord (b. 1535)
1621 – Bahāʾ al-dīn al-ʿĀmilī, co-founder of Isfahan School of Islamic Philosophy (b. 1547)
1751 – Christopher Polhem, Swedish physicist and engineer (b. 1661)
1773 – Peshwa Narayan Rao, Prime Minister of Maratha Empire (b. 1755, assassinated)
1856 – Gilbert Abbott à Beckett, English lawyer and author (b. 1811)
1879 – John Bell Hood, American general (b. 1831)
1886 – Ferris Jacobs, Jr., American general and politician (b. 1836)
1896 – Aleksey Lobanov-Rostovsky, Russian politician and diplomat, Minister of Foreign Affairs for Russia (b. 1824)

1901–present
1906 – Hans Auer, Swiss-Austrian architect and educator, designed the Federal Palace of Switzerland (b. 1847)
1907 – Richard Mansfield, American actor and manager (b. 1857)
1908 – Alexander P. Stewart, American general (b. 1821)
1928 – Wilhelm Wien, German physicist and academic, Nobel Prize laureate (b. 1864)
1935 – Henri Barbusse, French journalist and author (b. 1873)
  1935   – Namık İsmail, Turkish painter and educator (b. 1890)
1936 – Ronald Fellowes, 2nd Baron Ailwyn, English peer (b. 1886)
1938 – Max Factor, Sr., Polish-born American make-up artist and businessman, founded the Max Factor Company (b. 1877)
1940 – J. J. Thomson, English physicist and mathematician, Nobel Prize laureate (b. 1856)
1941 – Peder Oluf Pedersen, Danish physicist and engineer (b. 1874)
1943 – Eddy de Neve, Indonesian-Dutch footballer and lieutenant (b. 1885)
  1943   – Eustáquio van Lieshout, Dutch priest and missionary (b. 1890)
1945 – Alfréd Schaffer, Hungarian footballer, coach, and manager (b. 1893)
1946 – Konstantin Rodzaevsky, Russian lawyer (b. 1907)
1947 – Gunnar Sommerfeldt, Danish actor and director (b. 1890)
1948 – Alice Salomon, German-American social reformer (b. 1872)
1949 – Arthur Fielder, English cricketer (b. 1877)
1951 – Konstantin Märska, Estonian director and cinematographer (b. 1896)
1954 – Alfredo Ildefonso Schuster, Italian cardinal (b. 1880)
1961 – Cristóbal de Losada y Puga, Peruvian mathematician (b. 1894)
  1961   – Charles Coburn, American actor (b. 1877)
1963 – Guy Burgess, English-Soviet spy (b. 1911)
1964 – Salme Dutt, Estonian-English lawyer and politician (b. 1888)
1967 – Ad Reinhardt, American painter, illustrator, and academic (b. 1913)
1968 – William Talman, American actor and screenwriter (b. 1915)
1970 – Del Moore, American comedian and actor (b. 1916)
  1970   – Abraham Zapruder, American clothing manufacturer, witness to the assassination of John F. Kennedy
1971 – Ali Hadi Bara, Iranian-Turkish sculptor (b. 1906)
1979 – Jean Seberg, American actress (b. 1938)
1981 – Vera-Ellen, American actress and dancer (b. 1921)
  1981   – Mohammad-Ali Rajai, Iranian politician, 2nd President of Iran (b. 1933)
1985 – Taylor Caldwell, English-American author (b. 1900)
1988 – Jack Marshall, New Zealand colonel, lawyer and politician, 28th Prime Minister of New Zealand (b. 1912)
1989 – Seymour Krim, American journalist and critic (b. 1922)
1990 – Bernard D. H. Tellegen, Dutch engineer and academic (b. 1900)
1991 – Cyril Knowles, English footballer and manager (b. 1944)
  1991   – Vladimír Padrůněk, Czech bass player (b. 1952)
  1991   – Jean Tinguely, Swiss painter and sculptor (b. 1925)
1993 – Richard Jordan, American actor (b. 1938)
1994 – Lindsay Anderson, English director and screenwriter (b. 1923)
1995 – Fischer Black, American economist and academic (b. 1938)
  1995   – Sterling Morrison, American guitarist and singer (b. 1942)
1996 – Christine Pascal, French actress, director, and screenwriter (b. 1953)
1999 – Reindert Brasser, Dutch discus thrower (b. 1912)
  1999   – Raymond Poïvet, French illustrator (b. 1910)
2001 – Govan Mbeki, ANC activist and father of President of South Africa Thabo Mbeki (b. 1910)
2002 – J. Lee Thompson, English-Canadian director, producer, and screenwriter (b. 1914)
2003 – Charles Bronson, American actor and soldier (b. 1921)
  2003   – Donald Davidson, American philosopher and academic (b. 1917)
2004 – Fred Lawrence Whipple, American astronomer and academic (b. 1906)
2006 – Robin Cooke, Baron Cooke of Thorndon, New Zealand lawyer and judge (b. 1926)
  2006   – Glenn Ford, Canadian-American actor and producer (b. 1916)
  2006   – Naguib Mahfouz, Egyptian journalist and author, Nobel Prize laureate (b. 1911)
2007 – Michael Jackson, English author and journalist (b. 1942)
  2007   – Charles Vanik, American soldier and politician (b. 1918)
2008 – Brian Hambly, Australian rugby player and coach (b. 1937)
  2008   – Killer Kowalski, Canadian-American wrestler and trainer (b. 1926)
2009 – Klaus-Peter Hanisch, German footballer (b. 1952)
2010 – J. C. Bailey, American wrestler (b. 1983)
  2010   – Alain Corneau, French director and screenwriter (b. 1943)
  2010   – Myrtle Edwards, Australian cricketer and softball player (b. 1921)
  2010   – Francisco Varallo, Argentinian footballer (b. 1910)
2013 – William C. Campbell, American golfer (b. 1923)
  2013   – Howie Crittenden, American basketball player and coach (b. 1933)
  2013   – Allan Gotthelf, American philosopher and academic (b. 1942)
  2013   – Seamus Heaney, Irish poet and playwright, Nobel Prize laureate (b. 1939)
  2013   – Leo Lewis, American football player and coach (b. 1933)
2014 – Charles Bowden, American non-fiction author, journalist and essayist (b. 1945)
  2014   – Bipan Chandra, Indian historian and academic (b. 1928)
  2014   – Igor Decraene, Belgian cyclist (b. 1996)
  2014   – Andrew V. McLaglen, English-American director and producer (b. 1920)
  2014   – Felipe Osterling, Peruvian lawyer and politician (b. 1932)
2015 – Wes Craven, American director, producer, screenwriter, and actor (b. 1939)
  2015   – Edward Fadeley, American lawyer and politician (b. 1929)
  2015   – M. M. Kalburgi, Indian scholar, author, and academic (b. 1938)
  2015   – Marvin Mandel, American lawyer and politician, 56th Governor of Maryland (b. 1920)
  2015   – Oliver Sacks, English-American neurologist, author, and academic (b. 1933)
2017 – Louise Hay, American motivational author (b. 1926)
  2017   – Skip Prokop, Canadian drummer, guitarist and keyboardist (b. 1943)
2019 – Valerie Harper, American actress and writer (b. 1939)
 2022 – Mikhail Gorbachev, the 8th and final leader of the Soviet Union. (b. 1931)

Holidays and observances
 Christian feast day:
 Alexander of Constantinople (Eastern Orthodoxy)
 Blessed Alfredo Ildefonso Schuster
 Blessed Eustáquio van Lieshout
 Blessed Stephen Nehmé (Maronite Church / Catholic Church)
 Charles Chapman Grafton (Episcopal Church)
 Fantinus
 Felix and Adauctus
 Fiacre
 Jeanne Jugan
 Narcisa de Jesús
 Pammachius
 August 30 (Eastern Orthodox liturgics)
 Constitution Day (Kazakhstan)
 Constitution Day  (Turks and Caicos Islands)
 Independence Day (Tatarstan, Russia not formally recognized)
 International Day of the Disappeared
 International Whale Shark Day 
 Popular Consultation Day (East Timor)
 Saint Rose of Lima's Day (Peru)
 Victory Day (Turkey)

References

External links

 
 
 

Days of the year
August